The Subcommittee on Water Resources and Environment is a subcommittee within the House Transportation and Infrastructure Committee.

Jurisdiction
The subcommittee has jurisdiction over water conservation, pollution control, infrastructure, and hazardous waste cleanup, the civil works programs of the U.S. Army Corps of Engineers, and the Clean Water Act programs of the U.S. Environmental Protection Agency (EPA). Other agencies under the subcommittee’s jurisdiction include the Tennessee Valley Authority, the Saint Lawrence Seaway Development Corporation, the International Boundary Water Commission, and certain programs of the National Oceanic and Atmospheric Administration and the Natural Resources Conservation Service.

Members, 117th Congress

Historical membership rosters

115th Congress

116th Congress

External links
Subcommittee website

References

Transportation Water
Tennessee Valley Authority
Saint Lawrence Seaway
National Oceanic and Atmospheric Administration
Water law in the United States
Water resource management in the United States
Water conservation in the United States